Dirona is a genus of sea slugs.

Dirona may also refer to:

 Sirona, Celtic goddess, also written Đirona
 Yomra, formerly Dirona, a renamed town in Turkey